The GAZ-MM is a medium-duty truck (Class 4-Class 5) produced at the Gorki Auto Plant from 1938 to 1948, and then at the Ulyanovsky Auto Plant, up to 1956. The truck was a modernized variant of the GAZ-AA truck, but using the engine from the GAZ-M1, upgrading the vehicle's power to 50 hp. 

Due to some engine shortages at the factory, some believe that the actual mass-production of the GAZ-MM trucks only started in 1940, since the GAZ-M1 engine needed to get firstly used in the GAZ-AAA and BA-10 vehicles.

In 1942 a simplified variant of the truck, with the GAZ-MM-V index started getting produced, due to material shortages, but limited production of the original "unsimplified" GAZ-MM continued. After the Great Patriotic War ended, the production of all the variants of the GAZ-MM fully restarted, but by that time the Gorki plant was producing the newer GAZ-51 truck, which was based on the design and pattern of the Studebaker US6 truck.

Due to these reasons, the production of the GAZ-MM truck was transferred to the Ulyanovsky Auto Plant, where production lasted until 1956, when the vehicle was fully discontinued.

Variants
Most of the variants of the GAZ-MM were just modernized variants of the ones from the GAZ-AA series.

 GAZ-65: Prototype halftrack version. Produced in 1940.
 4M GAZ-AAA: Anti-air truck fitted with quadruple 4M Maxim M1910 gun.
 72-K GAZ-MM: Anti-air truck fitted with a 25 mm automatic air defense gun M1940 (72-K) cannon built during World War II.
 GAZ-55: ambulance version.
 GAZ-42: gas generator-powered version.
 GAZ-MM-V: simplified variant.

References

Further reading 
 Andy Thompson: Trucks of the Soviet Union: The Definitive History. Behemont 2017, .

GAZ Group trucks
1930s cars
Military vehicles introduced in the 1930s